Karenis (formerly, Gyumush and Glamuzh) is a village in Kotayk Province of Armenia.

See also 
Kotayk Province

References 

Populated places in Kotayk Province